Scopula ourebi is a moth of the  family Geometridae. It was described by Claude Herbulot in 1985. It is found in South Africa.

References

Endemic moths of South Africa
Moths described in 1985
ourebi
Moths of Africa